BMW Type 255 Kompressor (also known as the  500 Kompressor, RS 255, RS255 and Type 255 RS 500) was a supercharged boxer twin race motorcycle from the 1930s.  A BMW 255 Kompressor was ridden to victory by Georg Meier in the 1939 Isle of Man TT and the first win by a non-British competitor in the premier 500cc Senior TT class.   A similar BMW 255 Kompressor  machine was auctioned in 2013 for US$480,000, the second-highest price ever paid at auction for a motorcycle.

Supercharger
A Zoller sliding vane supercharger is bolted to the front of the DOHC engine, driven directly by the crankshaft, and is lubricated by castor oil added to the fuel. It provided c. .

Records

Today
An example is on display at the BMW Museum in Munich.

Further reading
1939 BMW "Kompressor" Tourist Trophy 1–2 Victory June, 2009 BMW press release via WebBikeWorld
Extensive model information at Bonhams (prior to January, 2013 auction)

References

External links

Type 255
Shaft drive motorcycles
Grand Prix motorcycles
Land speed record motorcycles